Strongyli Megistis, also called plainly Strongyli or Ypsili, is a Greek islet which lies in the eastern Mediterranean Sea, about four kilometers south-east of the island of Kastellorizo. It is rather flat and covered with macchia. The islet has no permanent residents.

Strongyli is the easternmost Greek territory. Administratively it is part of the Municipality of Megisti. According to the 2011 census the island is deserted. It has a lighthouse, which has the characteristic of being the easternmost building in Greece. There is also a cargo aerial cableway which is used by the army to transport cargo from the area of disembarkation to the Surveillance Outpost of Stroghyli.

The islet is named  Çam Adası ("Pine island") in Turkish.

See also
List of islands of Greece

References

External links 
 Official website of Municipality of Megisti 

Kastellorizo
Dodecanese
Landforms of Rhodes (regional unit)
Islands of the South Aegean
Islands of Greece